Ursa Louis Freed ( Ersa, 21 June 1890 – 5 July1957) was an American architect active in North and South Dakota. A number of his works are listed on the U.S. National Register of Historic Places. He was a member of the American Institute of Architects from 1951 until his death in 1957.

Works by U.L. Freed include (with attribution):
Codington County Courthouse (built 1929), 1st Ave., SE, Watertown, South Dakota (Freed, Perkins & McWayne), NRHP-listed
Ipswich Baptist Church (built 1924), Main St. and 3rd Ave., Ipswich, South Dakota (Freed, U.L.), NRHP-listed
Municipal Building/City Hall (built 1941), 206 Main Street, Faith, South Dakota (Freed, U.L, Works Progress Administration), NRHP-listed
Immaculate Conception Catholic Church (built 1949), Winner, South Dakota
At least one building in the Aberdeen Historic District in Aberdeen, South Dakota.
Saint Mary Church, Warroad, Minnesota
Saint Mary of the Presentation Church, Breckenridge, Minnesota

References

1890 births
1957 deaths
20th-century American architects
Fellows of the American Institute of Architects